Los Angeles City College (LACC) is a public community college in East Hollywood, California. A part of the Los Angeles Community College District, it is located on Vermont Avenue south of Santa Monica Boulevard on the former campus of the University of California, Los Angeles (UCLA).

History

The LACC campus was originally a farm outside Los Angeles, owned by Dennis Sullivan. It is one of nine separate college campuses of the Los Angeles Community College District. When the Pacific Electric Interurban Railroad connected downtown Los Angeles and Hollywood in 1909, the area began to develop rapidly. In 1914, the LA Board of Education moved the teachers' Normal School to the site. The Italian Romanesque campus became the original campus of the University of California, Los Angeles (UCLA) in 1919. In need of more space, UCLA moved to its present location in Westwood in 1929. On September 9, 1929, the campus opened its doors as Los Angeles Junior College with over 1,300 students and 54 teachers. The campus changed its name to Los Angeles City College in 1938.

The California State University, Los Angeles (Cal State LA) was founded on July 2, 1947 by an act of the California legislature and opened for classes as Los Angeles State College (LASC) on the campus of Los Angeles City College. As president of LACC, P. Victor Peterson also became the acting president of the state college.

In 1949, when Howard S. McDonald became president of both Los Angeles State College and Los Angeles City College, they were housed in borrowed spaces with part-time faculty. He hired administrators to help him formally organize the colleges, then found a site within Los Angeles city limits for a permanent campus for Cal State LA. The Los Angeles Board of Education then bought the LACC site for $700,000.

The in-state tuition and fees for 2017-2018 were $1,220, and out-of-state tuition and fees were $7,538. There is no application fee. The school utilizes a semester-based academic year. The student-faculty ratio is 23-to-1. Total enrollment of 13,827 full-time 3,999 and part-time 9,828 students.

Presidents
 P. Victor Peterson
 Howard S. McDonald
 John Lombardi

Gallery

Notable people

See also 

California Community Colleges System

References

External links

 
Two-year colleges in the United States
California Community Colleges
Educational institutions established in 1929
Schools accredited by the Western Association of Schools and Colleges
Universities and colleges in Los Angeles
East Hollywood, Los Angeles
1929 establishments in California
University of California, Los Angeles